Curry and Pepper is a 1990 Hong Kong action comedy film directed by Blackie Ko and starring Jacky Cheung and Stephen Chow. This film is Cheung and Chow's second film collaboration after the 1988 film, Faithfully Yours.

Plot
Curry and Pepper are two CID detectives that do not take their jobs seriously. When newspaper reporter Joey Law decides to film a documentary about daily police life, she chooses to film Curry and Pepper. As Curry and Pepper fight for Joey's affection, their friendship is seriously jeopardised. Eventually, the two reconcile and work together to take down a vicious hit man named Abalone. Later, they are dealing against North Korea Communists and kill them all for entering Hong Kong for with no permission.

Cast

Box office
This film grossed HK$15,777,856 in its theatrical run in Hong Kong from 24 May to 29 June 1990.

External links

Curry and Pepper at Hong Kong Cinemagic

1990 films
1990 action comedy films
1990s buddy comedy films
1990s crime comedy films
1990s Cantonese-language films
Films set in Hong Kong
Films shot in Hong Kong
Gun fu films
Hong Kong action comedy films
Hong Kong buddy films
Hong Kong crime comedy films
Police detective films
Films with screenplays by James Yuen
Films directed by Blackie Ko
1990s Hong Kong films